Oliver Reginald Kaizana Tambo  (27 October 191724 April 1993) was a South African anti-apartheid politician and activist who served as President of the African National Congress (ANC) from 1967 to 1991.

Biography

Higher education 
Oliver Tambo was born on 27 October 1917 in the village of Nkantolo in Bizana; eastern Pondoland in what is now the Eastern Cape. The village Tambo was born in was made up mostly of farmers. His father, Mzimeni Tambo, was the son of a farmer and an assistant salesperson at a local trading store. Mzimeni had four wives and ten children, all of whom were literate. Oliver's mother, Mzimeni's third wife, was called Julia.

Tambo graduated in 1938 as one of the top students.  After this, Tambo was admitted to the University of Fort Hare but in 1940 he, along with several others including Nelson Mandela, was expelled for participating in a student strike. In 1942, Tambo returned to his former high school in Johannesburg to teach science and mathematics.

League
In 1944, Tambo, Mandela and Walter Sisulu founded the ANC Youth League, with Tambo becoming its first National Secretary and a member of the National Executive in 1948. The Youth League proposed a change in the tactics of the anti-apartheid movement. Previously, the ANC had sought to further its cause by actions such as petitions and demonstrations; the Youth League felt these actions were insufficient to achieve the group's goals and proposed their own "Programme of Action". This programme advocated tactics such as boycotts, civil disobedience, strikes, and non-collaboration.

In 1955, Tambo became Secretary-general of the ANC after Sisulu was banned by the South African government under the Suppression of Communism Act. In 1958, he became Deputy President of the ANC and in 1959 was served with a five-year banning order by the government.

Exile to London
In response, Tambo was sent abroad by the ANC to mobilize opposition to apartheid on 21 March 1960. He settled with his family in Muswell Hill, north London, where he lived until 1990. His exile took a toll on him not seeing his wife and three children, but his wife Adelaide supported the ANC at home by taking in ANC members arriving from the UK.

In 1967, Tambo became Acting President of the ANC, following the death of Chief Albert Lutuli. He sought to keep the ANC together even after he was exiled from South Africa. Due to his skillful lobbying, he was able to attract talented South African exiles, one of them being Thabo Mbeki.

On 30 December 1979 in Lusaka, Zambia, Tambo as president and Alfred Nzo, then secretary-general of the ANC, met Tim Jenkin, Stephen Lee and Alex Moumbaris, ANC members and escapees from incarceration at Phillip Kgosi Prison as political prisoners. Their presence was officially announced by the ANC in early January and Tambo introduced them at a press conference on 2 January 1980.

Guerrilla activity
Tambo was directly responsible for organizing active guerilla units. Along with his comrades Nelson Mandela, Joe Slovo, and Walter Sisulu, Tambo directed and facilitated several attacks against the South African public. In a 1985 interview, Tambo was quoted as saying, "In the past, we were saying the ANC will not deliberately take innocent life. But now, looking at what is happening in South Africa, it is difficult to say civilians are not going to die."

The post-apartheid Truth and Reconciliation Commission (TRC) in 1997–1998 identified Tambo as the person who gave final approval for the 20 May 1983 Church Street bombing, which resulted in the death of 19 people and injuries to 197–217 people. The attack was orchestrated by a special operations unit of the ANC's Umkhonto we Sizwe (MK), commanded by Aboobaker Ismail. Such units had been authorized by Tambo as President of the ANC in 1979. At the time of the attack, they reported to Joe Slovo as chief of staff.

The ANC's submission said that the bombing was in response to a South African cross-border raid into Lesotho in December 1982 which killed 42 ANC supporters and civilians, and the assassination of Ruth First, an ANC activist and wife of Joe Slovo, in Maputo, Mozambique. It claimed that 11 of the casualties were SADF personnel and hence a military target. The legal representative of some of the victims argued that as they were administrative staff, including telephonists and typists, they could not be considered a legitimate military target.

Ten MK operatives, including Ismail, applied for amnesty for this and other bombings. The applications were opposed on various grounds, including that it was a terrorist attack disproportionate to the political motive. The TRC found that the number of civilians versus military personnel killed was unclear. South African Police statistics indicated that seven members of the SADF were killed. The commission found that at least 84 of the injured were SADF members or employees. Amnesty was granted by the TRC.

In 1985, he was re-elected President of the ANC.

Return to South Africa
He returned to South Africa on 13 December 1990 after over 30 years in exile. He was able to return to South Africa because of the legalization of the ANC. When he returned after his time in exile he received much support. Some of that support even came from old rivals. However, because of his stroke in 1989, it was harder for him to fulfill his duties as President of the ANC, so in 1991, at the ANC's 48th National Conference, Nelson Mandela took over as president of the ANC. When he stepped down as president, however, the congress created a special position for him as the National Chairman.

Death
After suffering complications following a stroke, Tambo died on April 24, 1993, at the age of 75. His death came 14 days after Chris Hani's assassination and one year before the 1994 general election in which Nelson Mandela became President. Mandela, Thabo Mbeki and Walter Sisulu attended the funeral. Tambo was buried in Benoni, Gauteng.

International relationships

The strong fight against apartheid brought Tambo to form a series of intense international relationships.
In 1977, Tambo signed the first solidarity agreement between the ANC and a municipality: the Italian town of Reggio Emilia was the first city in the world to sign such a pact of solidarity. This was the beginning of a long understanding which brought Italy to put an effort into concrete actions to support the right of southern African people's self-determination; one of these actions was the organization of solidarity ships. The first one, called "Amanda", departed from Genova in 1980.
It was Tambo himself who asked Reggio Emilia to mint Isitwalandwe Medals, the greatest of the ANC's honors.

Honours

In 2004, he was voted number 31 in SABC3's Great South Africans, scoring lower than H. F. Verwoerd, before the SABC decided to cancel the final rounds of voting. The decision to cancel the results was largely informed by the fact that the majority of blacks South Africans did not participate in the voting, as SABC3 caters predominantly to English speakers.

In late 2005, ANC politicians announced plans to rename Johannesburg International Airport after him. Then-President Thabo Mbeki at this time did not side with this idea, and there was a behind closed door meeting deliberating on this. This went on and on, and Thabo Mbeki even requested that they name only a small road in the city of Inthokozo in the heart of Soshanguve in Johannesburg, then former capital of South Africa, before Pretoria became the capital city. Votes were in favour of the idea and against Mbeki and the proposal was accepted and the renaming ceremony occurred on 27 October 2006. The ANC-dominated government had previously renamed Jan Smuts Airport as Johannesburg International Airport in 1994 on the grounds that South African airports should not be named after political figures.

There is a sculpture of Tambo at the Albert Road Recreation Ground, Muswell Hill, close to his London home. In February 2021, Haringey Council renamed the park as the O.R. Tambo Recreation Ground. In June 2013, the city of Reggio Emilia in Italy celebrated Tambo with the creation of a park dedicated to the President of the African National Congress.

His house at 51 Alexandra Park Road, Muswell Hill, London, was purchased by the South African Government in 2010 as a historic monument and now bears a plaque.

Tambo's grave was declared a National Heritage site when he died but lost this status when his wife, Adelaide Tambo, died and was buried alongside him. However their grave was re-declared a National Heritage site in October 2012.

To conclude the centenary celebrations of the birth of Tambo, a commemoration was held at Regina Mundi Catholic Church in Moroka, Soweto on 27 October 2017. This same event marked also the centenary of the sinking of the troopship SS Mendi. The event was curated by Ambassador Lindiwe Mabuza and Fr Lawrence Mduduzi Ndlovu, together with the Thabo Mbeki Foundation and the Oliver and Adelaide Tambo Foundation.

See also 

 List of people subject to banning orders under apartheid

Notes

Further reading

ANC biography
SAHO biography
https://www.britannica.com/topic/African-National-Congress

https://www.britannica.com/biography/Oliver-Tambo
The African Activist Archive Project website includes the audio of a January 1987 Reception Honoring ANC President Oliver R. Tambo hosted by the American Committee on Africa and The Africa Fund with remarks by Harry Belafonte, Jennifer Davis, and Tambo. The website includes other material on Tambo.

Books
Baai, Gladstone Sandi (2006): Oliver Reginald Tambo: Teacher, Lawyer & Freedom Fighter, Houghton(South Africa): Mutloatse Arts Heritage Trust.
Callinicos, L. (2004). Oliver Tambo: Beyond the Engeli Mountains. Claremont, South Africa: David Philip.
Pallo Jordan, Z. (2007): Oliver Tambo Remembered, Johannesburg: Pan Macmillan.
Tambo, O., & Reddy, E. S. (1987): Oliver Tambo and the Struggle against Apartheid, New Delhi: Sterling Publishers, in collaboration with the Namedia Foundation.
Tambo, Oliver & Tambo, Adelaide (1988): Preparing for Power: Oliver Tambo Speaks, New York: G. Braziller, ©1987.
Tambo, O., & Reddy, E. S.(1991): Oliver Tambo, Apartheid and the International Community: Addresses to United Nations Committees and Conferences, New Delhi: Namedia Foundation: Sterling Publishers.
Van Wyk, Chris (2003): Oliver Tambo. Gallo Manor, South Africa: Awareness Pub. Learning African history freedom fighters series.

1917 births
1993 deaths
People from Mbizana Local Municipality
Xhosa people
South African Anglicans
Presidents of the African National Congress
Anti-apartheid activists
South African revolutionaries
People from Muswell Hill
South African exiles
South African expatriates in the United Kingdom
University of Fort Hare alumni
Recipients of the Order of Friendship of Peoples
UMkhonto we Sizwe personnel